Michael Antoine Merritt (born September 3, 1984) is a former American football tight end. He was drafted by the Kansas City Chiefs in the seventh round of the 2008 NFL Draft. He played college football at UCF. Merritt never played for the Chiefs in the 2008 season and was released in the off-season.

External links
Kansas City Chiefs bio
UCF Knights bio

References

1984 births
Living people
Sportspeople from West Palm Beach, Florida
American football tight ends
UCF Knights football players
Kansas City Chiefs players
Players of American football from Florida
Tampa Bay Storm players